Benkeith's short-tailed bat (Carollia benkeithi) is a leaf-nosed bat species found in Peru, Bolivia, and Brazil. It very closely resembles the chestnut short-tailed bat, and the two species are likely often confused.

Taxonomy and etymology
Benkeith's short-tailed bat was described as a new species in 2006. The holotype had been collected in 1983,  to the south of Tingo María, Peru.
The eponym for the species name "benkeithi" was Ben E. Keith, who donated $5 million to Texas Tech University.

Description
Benkeith's short-tailed bat is a relatively small species of short-tailed fruit bat. The fur on its back is chestnut brown, while its belly fur is a dull, grayish-brown.

Biology and ecology
Based on stable isotope analysis, it likely consumes a considerable amount of insects in addition to plant material such as fruit.

Range and habitat
Benkeith's short-tailed bat is found in northeastern Bolivia, eastern Peru, and western Brazil. In Brazil, it is uncommon within the central Amazon basin.

References

External links
 Arctos Database Entry
 iSpecies Database Entry

Carollia
Bats of South America
Bats of Brazil
Mammals described in 2006